Radio Laeveld is an Afrikaans-language radio station broadcasting on 100.5 FM in the Lowveld area of Mpumalanga, South Africa. It received its first four-year broadcast licence on 1 March 2003 and began broadcasting 31 May 2003. Broadcasting mainly in Afrikaans and in English. The footprint covers roughly a 100km radius from Nelspruit in Mpumalanga. Listeners are from all walks of life and includes farmers, office bound workers, representatives and travelling sales people, tourists, small and medium enterprise owners & managers, teachers, municipal and local community care organizations. The targeted audience are in LSM 6-10, age group 35-55 and program content focused on family Life style.

Current Team 
Current Board Members: Kobus Bester (Chairman), Vanessa Roets (Public Relations), Jan-Frans Van Aard, Lasea Swift, Estelle Roe, Marilise Heyneke.

Current Management & Employees: Robin Jansma (Station Manager), Connie Moyana (Cleaning), Myles Walters (Sound Technician). 

Current Presenters: Amanda Botha, Ludi Botha, Derek Wolf, Roelf Van Jaarsveld, Geraldine Scholtz, Helmi White, Tom Farmer, Charissa Du Toit, Anmané Eckard. Charles Gentle returned (in 2018) after a short distraction from broadcasting on 100.5FM.

Current Journalists: Mireilles de Villiers, Anmané Eckard

Current Sales People: Alichia Van Ee, Denise Von zweel, Lorraine Tolken, Jeandre Tolken.

Previous Team 
The very first voice heard at 6h00 on 31 May 2003 was Pieter Rischmuller (on loan from Radio Pretoria), who at the time was asked to assist the station until it found its feet. After that various presenters from the community were part of the different shows on the radio:

Previous Board : 
Adam Van Deventer,
Dalene Muller,
Annemarie van Biljon,
Christo Botha

Previous Management : 
Martin Jansen (first station manager),
James Williams (also the first program manager and sound technician of the station),
Gert Booysen (station manager)

Previous Office : 
Loretta Vorster (Reception), 
Donald Grey (Sound technician),
Coenie van Deventer (Sound technician)
Richard Bessinger (Sound technician).

Previous Sales Representatives :
Yolande Calvert
Louw Botes
Jannie vd Bergh
Ansie Botes
Cornu Du Pisanie

Previous Presenters : 
Neels Kemp, 
Sanett Oosthuizen,
Jan Prinsloo, 
Lappies Labuschagne (later acting-station manager),
Denis Wales,
Bokkie Taute,
Bez Bezuidenhout,
Andri Roodt,
Endria Stronkhorst,
Cindy Labuschagne (first teen-presenter),
Dennis Wales,
Sarie Saayman,
Jannie van der Berg,
Giep Van Zyl,
Franswa Eloff,
Theresa Schoeman, 
Jeanne Steyn,
Jean Steyn,
Sanette van Wyk (Mattheus),
Frieda Rieger,
Annemarie van Heerden,
Anike vd Merwe, 
Pieter Malan,  
and more. (t.b.c.)

History 
It all started when the need for a local community radio station, focused on Afrikaans culture and language in the Lowveld of Mpumalanga was identified by a group like minded people known as 'Die Verkenners'. The idea was spearheaded, around two years before the license was awarded, by Albertus Van Zijl (a local business man and lawyer), who also later became the first Chairman. At that stage the frequency 100.5FM was in use by Radio Pretoria who were broadcasting from Pretoria. Negotiations centered around the fostering of Afrikaans language, believes and culture in the Lowveld through this broadcasting service. The original studios were in the White River Centre (from 31 May 2003 to 30 September 2005) and later moved to Nelspruit (1 August 2005) in the Sonpark centre (where it currently still is).

Coverage
Radio Laeveld reaches the following towns:
 Nelspruit
 Witrivier
 Barberton
 Kaapchehoop
 Kaapmuiden
 Malelane
 Hectorspruit
 Komatipoort
 Skukuza
 Hazyview
 Sabie 
 Graskop
 Lydenburg
 Machadodorp
 Dullstroom
 Belfast

Shows 
Monday to Friday

 05h00-06h00 Landbouradio
 06h00-09h00 Breakfast show
 9h00-9h30 (Friday) WieleFM
 09h00-10h00 Promotional Talks
 10h00-12h00 Family Lifestyle
 12h00-12h30 Vlooimark
 12h30-15h00 Mid Day show
 15h00-18h00 Afternoon Drive 
 18h00-20h00 (Monday) Gospel Music Program
 18h00-19h00 (Tuesday & Friday) Young Gospel  program
 18h00-19h00 (Wednesday) Local Gospel Program
 18h00-19h00 (Thursday) Youth Interest Program
 19h00-22h00 (Friday) South African non-commercial Rock Program
 19h00-20h00 (Wednesday) Afrikaans Literature & Culture
 20h00-23h00 (Monday to Thursday) Late-night Music Requests
 22h00-23h00 (Friday) Blues Music Program 

Saturday

 05h00-07h00 LandbouradioLandbouradio
 07h00-09h00 Saturday Breakfast
 09h00-10h00 Lowveld Experience
 10h00-12h00 Magazine Show
 12h00-13h00 Vlooimark Vlooimark
 13h00-15h00 Top 20 Top 20 Music
 15h00-18h00 Sport & Food
 18h00-19h00 Boere Music
 19h00-23h00 Re-broadcasts 

Sunday

 05h00-08h00 Thought Of The Day
 08h00-09h00 Gospel & Religion
 09h00-10h00 Magazine Show
 10h00-11h00 Gospel & Religion
 11h00-12h00 Focus on Elders
 12h00-14h00 Sunday Requests
 14h00-17h00 Golden Oldies Music Program
 17h00-18h00 Radio Drama Omnibus
 18h00-19h00 Gospel & Religion
 19h00-20h00 Evening Service (Sermon)
 20h00-23h00 Gospel & Religion

References

Radio stations in South Africa
Radio stations established in 2003
2003 establishments in South Africa
Mass media in Mpumalanga